V. Balram (also written as V. Balaram; 10 November 1947 – 18 January 2020) was an Indian lawyer and politician from Kerala belonging to Indian National Congress who was the general secretary of the Kerala Pradesh Congress Committee. He was elected as a member of the Kerala Legislative Assembly from Wadakkanchery in 1996 and 2001.

Biography
Balram was born on 10 November 1947 to T. Raman Nair and Vellur Chinnammu Amma. He was the general secretary of the Kerala Pradesh Congress Committee.

Balram was elected as a member of the Kerala Legislative Assembly from Wadakkanchery in 1996. He was also elected from this constituency in 2001. He resigned from his legislator post in 2004. K. Muraleedharan contested from his assembly constituency in bypoll and he contested from Kozhikode in Lok Sabha Election 2004. Both of them lost in the elections.

Balram was married to Kanchanamala. They had two daughters. The names of their two daughters are Deepa and Laxmi.

Balram died on 18 January 2020 at the age of 72.

References

1947 births
Kerala MLAs 1996–2001
Kerala MLAs 2001–2006
Indian National Congress politicians from Kerala
2020 deaths
People from Thrissur district
Indian lawyers